Surin City Football Club (Thai: สโมสรฟุตบอลจังหวัดสุรินทร์) is a Thai semi-professional football club based in Surin Province. The club currently plays in Thai League 3 Northeastern region.

Timeline
History of events of Surin Football Club

Stadium and locations

Season by season record

P = Played
W = Games won
D = Games drawn
L = Games lost
F = Goals for
A = Goals against
Pts = Points
Pos = Final position

QR1 = First Qualifying Round
QR2 = Second Qualifying Round
R1 = Round 1
R2 = Round 2
R3 = Round 3
R4 = Round 4

R5 = Round 5
R6 = Round 6
QF = Quarter-finals
SF = Semi-finals
RU = Runners-up
W = Winners

Players

Current squad

Coaching staff

References

External links
 Official Website of Surin FC
   Official Facebook of Surin City FC
  Unofficial Surin City FC Fan Club

Football clubs in Thailand
Association football clubs established in 2009
Sport in Surin province
2009 establishments in Thailand